Qazi Hamidullah Khan (1936 - 18 April 2012) was a Pakistani Islamic scholar and former member of the member of the 12th National Assembly of Pakistan from 16 November 2002 until 10 October 2007.

Early life and education
Khan was born in 1934 in Charsadda District of Khyber Pakhtunkhwa. He got his early education from his hometown and then entered to Jamia Ashrafia in Lahore.

Career
President and Sheikh ul Hadees of Jamia Mazahir Uloom and Jamia Anwar ul Uloom at Gujranwala. Khatib at Jamia Masjid Anwaar e Madina.
He also served as central Vice Emir of Jamiat Ulema-e-Islam (F).

Death
Khan died on 18 April 2012. He was buried in his native hometown Charsadda after offering funeral prayers at Sheranwala Bagh, Gujranwala on the morning of April 19, 2012.

References

1936 births
2012 deaths
People from Charsadda District, Pakistan
Pakistani Islamic religious leaders
Pakistani MNAs 2002–2007
Jamiat Ulema-e-Islam (F) politicians
Pakistani Sunni Muslim scholars of Islam
Deobandis
Jamia Ashrafia alumni